My Boy Lollipop was the first album for Jamaican singer Millie Small and her only album for Smash Records. On the front and back of the album, Millie is called "the Blue Beat Girl".  Ernest Ranglin was credited for the accompaniment and direction.

The back of the album contains an essay about Millie. It tells a little bit of her early life in Jamaica then tells how a talent contest led to a recording career and hit singles in Jamaica, which led to her discovery by British record producer Chris Blackwell. According to the essay, Blackwell then brought her to London to promote her talent and a new type of Jamaican music called "Ska." The essay also mistakenly says that she was born on October 8, 1948; she was actually born on October 6, 1947. The essay also includes quotes by Millie about her newfound fame. The essay's conclusion tells of the success of her 1964 hit "My Boy Lollipop" in the US and how it made her one of the most sought-after performers by producers of television and stage, and adds that Millie had also finished a movie role.

"Don't You Know" (which did not chart) and the title track were two singles that were released before the album. "Sweet William" (a minor hit) was lifted from the album.

Track listing

Charts
Album - Billboard (United States)

Singles - Billboard (United States)

1964 debut albums
Smash Records albums
Millie Small albums